Bezymyannoye is a rural locality (a selo) in Raychikhinsky Selsoviet of Bureysky District, Amur Oblast, Russia. The population was 106 as of 2018. There are 8 streets. Its name is Russian for "nameless" (neuter singular).

Geography 
Bezymyannoye is located on the right bank of the Kupriyanikha River, 68 km west of Novobureysky (the district's administrative centre) by road. Staraya Raychikha is the nearest rural locality.

References 

Rural localities in Bureysky District